Baltal may refer to:

 Baltal (art form), a type of Korean puppet theatre
 Baltal, Jammu and Kashmir